Chiapas, DIE Wasserbahn is an Intamin flume ride in Phantasialand, a theme park in Germany, which opened on 1 April 2014. It is located in the park's Mexico area and replaced Stonewash and Wildwash Creek, which were both demolished in 2011. Its 53° drop is the steepest drop on a log flume in the world.

The soundtrack for Chiapas was composed by Andreas and Sebastian Kübler of IMAscore and features the 65-person Budapest Film Music Orchestra.

References

2014 establishments in Germany